This is a list of buildings that are examples of the Art Deco architectural style in Florida, United States.

Fort Lauderdale 

 Birch Tower Sky Garden, Fort Lauderdale
 Elbo Room, Fort Lauderdale, 1938
 Las Olas Beach Club, Fort Lauderdale

Fort Myers 

 Edison Theater, Fort Myers Downtown Commercial District, Forty Myers, 1939
 Elks Club, Fort Myers, 1937
 Franklin Shops, Fort Myers

Jacksonville 

 Adel Supermarket (now Winn-Dixie), Jacksonville, 1940s
 American Red Cross Volunteer Life Saving Corps Station, Jacksonville, 1947
 Carter's Park & King Pharmacy, Jacksonville, 1942
 Central Fire Station, Jacksonville, 1901 and 1944
 Cummer Museum of Art and Gardens, Jacksonville, 1961
 Ed Austin Building (now State Attorney's Office), Jacksonville, 1933
 Groover-Stewart Drug Company Building, Jacksonville, 1925
 Museum of Contemporary Art Jacksonville (former Western Union Telegraph Company), Jacksonville, 1931
 Ritz Theatre, Jacksonville, 1929
 San Marco Theatre (former Cine San Marco), Jacksonville, 1938
 Theatre Jacksonville, Jacksonville, 1938

Miami 

 828 NW 9th Court, Miami, 1938
 Ace Theatre, Miami, 1930
 Alfred I. DuPont Building, Miami, 1939
 Burdines Department Store, Downtown Miami Historic District, Miami, 1920s and 1936
 Hotel Shelley, Miami
 Huntington Building, Miami, 1926
 McCrory Store Building, Downtown Miami Historic District, Miami, 1938
 Miami City Hall, Miami, 1934
 Olympia Theater, Miami, 1926
 S & S Sandwich Shop, Miami, 1938
 St. John's Baptist Church, Miami, 1940
 St. Sophia Greek Orthodox Cathedral, Miami
 Scottish Rite Masonic Temple, Miami, 1924
 Sears, Roebuck and Company Department Store, Miami, 1929
 Shrine Building, Miami, 1930
 Tower Theater, Little Havana, Miami, 1926
 W. T. Grant Building, Downtown Miami Historic District, Miami, 1906 and 1937
 Walgreen Drug Store, Miami, 1936
 Walker-Skagseth Food Stores, Downtown Miami Historic District, Miami, 1920 and 1934
 Woolworth's Building, Downtown Miami Historic District, Miami, 1903 and 1938

Miami Beach 

 1200 Washington Avenue, Miami Beach
 2615 Collins Avenue, Miami Beach, 1935
 Abbey Hotel, South Beach, Miami Beach
 Albion Hotel, Miami Beach, 1939
 Alden Hotel, Miami Beach, 1936
 Avalon, Miami Beach Architectural District, Miami Beach, 1941
 Bass Museum, Miami Beach, 1934
 Beach Patrol Headquarters, Miami Beach
 The Beachcomber (former Shepley Hotel), Miami Beach, 1938
 Beacon, Miami Beach Architectural District, Miami Beach, 1936
 Bellamar Hotel, Miami Beach, 1939
 Beth Jacob Social Hall and Congregation, Miami Beach, 1928
 Breakwater, Miami Beach Architectural District, Miami Beach, 1939
 Cadillac Hotel & Beach Club, Miami Beach, 1950s
 Cameo Theater, Miami Beach, 1938
 Cardozo, Miami Beach Architectural District, Miami Beach, 1939
 Caribbean Building, Miami Beach, 1941
 Carlton Hotel, Miami Beach, 1938
 Carlyle Hotel, Miami Beach, 1941
 Castle Beach Apartments, Miami Beach, 1936
 Cavalier, Miami Beach Architectural District, Miami Beach, 1936
 Century Hotel, Miami Beach, 1939
 Churchill Apartments, Collins Waterfront Architectural District, Miami Beach, 1940
 Clevelander, Miami Beach Architectural District, Miami Beach, 1939
 Clinton Hotel, Miami Beach, 1930s
 Colony Hotel, Miami Beach Architectural District, Miami Beach, 1935
 Copley Plaza, Miami Beach, 1940
 Crescent Hotel, Miami Beach, 1932
 Croydon Arms, Miami Beach, 1937
 Delano Hotel, Miami Beach, 1947
 Eden Roc Miami Beach Hotel, Miami Beach, 1956
 Edison, Miami Beach Architectural District, Miami Beach, 1935
 Embassy Hotel, Miami Beach, 1935
 Empire Hotel, Miami Beach
 Essex House, Miami Beach Architectural District, Miami Beach, 1938
 Fairwind Hotel (former Fairmont Hotel), Miami Beach, 1939
 Flamingo Apartments, Collins Waterfront Architectural District, Miami Beach, 1940
 Greenbrier Hotel, Collins Waterfront Architectural District, Miami Beach, 1940
 Greystone Miami Beach, Miami Beach, 1939
 Haddon Hall Hotel, Miami Beach, 1939
 Helen Mar Apartments, Miami Beach, 1936
 Hoffman's Cafeteria (now Señor Frog's), Miami Beach, 1939
 Hotel Versailles, Collins Waterfront Architectural District, Miami Beach, 1940
 Imperial, Miami Beach Architectural District, Miami Beach, 1939
 Indian Creek Hotel, Collins Waterfront Architectural District, Miami Beach, 1936
 Lake Drive Apartments, Miami Beach, 1936
 The Leslie Hotel, Ocean Drive, Miami Beach, 1937
 Lincoln–Drexel Building, Lincoln Road, Miami Beach
 Lincoln Theatre, Miami Beach, 1936
 Lord Baltimore Hotel, Collins Waterfront Architectural District, Miami Beach, 1941
 Lord Tarleton Hotel, Collins Waterfront Architectural District, Miami Beach, 1940
 Majestic, Miami Beach Architectural District, Miami Beach, 1940
 Malabo Apartment Hotel, Collins Waterfront Architectural District, Miami Beach, 1947
 Marlin Hotel, Miami Beach Architectural District, Miami Beach
 Miami Beach Post Office, Miami Beach, 1937
 Miljean Hotel, Miami Beach, 1940
 Netherlands, Miami Beach Architectural District, Miami Beach, 1935
 Ocean Spray Hotel, Miami Beach, 1936
 Palms Apartments, Collins Waterfront Architectural District, Miami Beach, 1936
 Park Central, Miami Beach Architectural District, Miami Beach, 1937
 Ritz Plaza Hotel, Miami Beach, 1939
 Riviera Condo, Collins Waterfront Architectural District, Miami Beach, 1939
 San Juan Hotel, Miami Beach, 1930s
 Sea-Jay Building, Collins Waterfront Architectural District, Miami Beach, 1937
 Shelborne Beach Resort, Miami Beach, 1940
 SLS South Beach Hotel, Miami Beach, 1939
 Sovereign Building, Collins Waterfront Architectural District, Miami Beach, 1941
 Stardust Apartments, South Beach, Miami Beach
 Surfcomber Hotel, South Beach, Miami Beach, 1948
 Taft Hotel, Miami Beach, 1936
 Traymore Hotel, Collins Waterfront Architectural District, Miami Beach, 1939
 Waldorf Towers, Miami Beach Architectural District, Miami Beach, 1937
 Webster Hotel, Miami Beach, 1936
 Wilshire Building, Collins Waterfront Architectural District, Miami Beach, 1939
 Wolfsonian-FIU, Florida International University, Miami Beach, 1936

Opa-locka 

 City Hall, Opa-locka, 1928
 King Trunk Factory and Showroom, Opa-locka, 1926
 Opa-Locka Railroad Station (now Harry Hurt Building), Opa-locka, 1926

Orlando 

 1220 Catherine Street, Lake Davis, Orlando, 1936
 324 DeSoto Circle, Orlando, 1939
 711 North Lake Davis Drive Bungalows, Lake Davis Park, Orlando, 1948
 ABC Commissary, Disney Hollywood Studios, Walt Disney World, Orlando, 1989
 Baldwin–Fairchild Conway Funeral Home, Orlando, 1940
 Beacham Theater (now a nightclub), Orlando, 1921 and 1936
 The Cameo (former Cameo Theatre), Orlando, 1940
 Colonial Photo & Hobby, Orlando, 1958
 Gibbs Louis House, Orlando
 Lake Eola Park Bandshell, Orlando
 Pantages Theater, Universal Studios, Orlando
 Publix, Orlando, late 1940s
 S. H. Kress and Co. Building, Orlando, 1936
 Track Shack, Orlando
 Washburn Imports, Orlando

St. Petersburg 

 Glory Apartments, St. Petersburg
 John & Florence McKeage House, St. Petersburg, 1938
 Myers Antiques, St. Petersburg
 Publix (now Family Dollar), St. Petersburg, 1951
 Publix (now Walgreens), St. Petersburg, 1940s

Sarasota 

 Chidsey Library, Sarasota, 1941
 Municipal Auditorium-Recreation Club, Sarasota, 1938
 S. H. United States and Co. Building, Sarasota, 1932
 Sarasota Municipal Auditorium, Sarasota, 1938

Tallahassee 

 Fire Station No. 2, Tallahassee
 George Firestone Building (former Old Leon County Jail), Tallahassee, 1936
 Leon County Health Unit Building, Tallahassee, 1940

Tampa 

 Cuscaden Park Swimming Pool, Tampa
 Publix, Tampa, 1995
 Tampa Linen Services Building, Tampa

Other cities 

 140 Monroe Drive House, West Palm Beach, 1935
 1609 Tyler Street House, Hollywood, 1965
 Amelia Island Museum of History, Fernandina Beach, 1938
 Celebration AMC Theater, Celebration, 1996
 Centennial Building, Port St. Joe, 1938
 Central Station, Sebring, 1927
 Clune Building, Miami Springs, 1925
 Dixie Crystal Theatre, Clewiston, 1941
 Florida Power and Light Company Ice Plant, Melbourne, 1926
 Fox Theater, Crestview Commercial Historic District, Crestview, 1947
 Hernando Park Bandshell, Brooksville
 Lake Worth Playhouse, Lake Worth Beach, 1924
 Larimer Memorial Library, Palatka, 1929
 Library of Florida History (former Cocoa Post Office), Cocoa, 1939
 Maitland Art Center, Maitland, 1937
 Martin Theatre (former Ritz), Panama City, 1936
 Nautical Aire Apartments, Delray Beach
 Old Martin County Courthouse, Stuart, 1937
 Old West Palm Beach National Guard Armory, West Palm Beach, 1939
 Park Theater (now Hope Tabernacle), Avon Park Historic District, Avon Park, 1935
 Port Theatre Art and Culture Center, Port St. Joe, 1938
 Prince Theatre, Pahokee, 1931
 Publix (now County Tax Collector's Office), Lakeland, 1956
 Publix, Tarpon Springs, 1940s
 Publix, Winter Haven, 1940
 Punta Gorda Ice Plant, Punta Gorda, 1926
 Rex Theatre, Pensacola, 1937
 S. H. Kress and Co. Building, Daytona Beach, 1932
 Seminole Theatre (now Seminole Cultural Arts Theatre), Homestead Historic Downtown District, Homestead, 1921 and 1940
 State Theatre, Plant City, 1939
 Streamline Hotel, Daytona Beach, 1939
 Temple Beth-El, Pensacola, 1933
 Valerie Theatre Cultural Center, Inverness, 1926
 Woman's Club of Ocoee, Ocoee, 1938

See also 

 List of Art Deco architecture
 List of Art Deco architecture in the United States

References 

 "Art Deco & Streamline Moderne Buildings." Roadside Architecture.com. Retrieved 2019-01-03.
 Cinema Treasures. Retrieved 2022-09-06
 "Court House Lover". Flickr. Retrieved 2022-09-06
 "New Deal Map". The Living New Deal. Retrieved 2020-12-25.
 "SAH Archipedia". Society of Architectural Historians. Retrieved 2021-11-21.

External links
 

 
Art Deco
Art Deco architecture in Florida